Haltdalen Station is a railway station located in the village of Haltdalen in the municipality of Holtålen in Trøndelag county, Norway.  It is located on the Røros Line. The station is served three times daily in each direction by Trøndelag Commuter Rail between the town of Røros and the city of Trondheim. The service is operated by SJ Norge.

History
The station was opened on 16 January 1877, the same year that the Røros Line was completed.

References

Holtålen
Railway stations in Trøndelag
Railway stations on the Røros Line
Railway stations opened in 1877
1877 establishments in Norway